Martin Leyland Roberts (born 20 July 1963) is an English television presenter, property expert, investor, entrepreneur and author. He presents the BBC One property auction series Homes Under the Hammer with co-presenters Martel Maxwell (since 2016) and Dion Dublin, although his co-presenter for many years was  Lucy Alexander. He also hosts the Talkradio show "Home Rule with Martin Roberts", where he chats about property.

Early life and career
Born in Warrington, Cheshire, Roberts was brought up in Stockton Heath, a suburb of Warrington. Roberts began his career in the late 1980s at BBC Radio Manchester. Roberts' grandfather was a well known organist at various Warrington chapels.

He attended Appleton Hall Grammar School then studied Electronic Engineering at the University of Bradford 1983–86 and was a DJ on Ramair, the university's radio station. Roberts has worked as a property developer since the early 1990s and has contributed to several publications, both on the subject of property development and travel.

Since then, he has presented several other programmes including Put Your Money Where Your Mouth Is and How to Survive the Property Crisis, both for the BBC as well as ITV's travel programme Wish You Were Here...? Roberts is most famous for being BBC's UK and Overseas Property expert writing and presenting Homes Under the Hammer having done since the programme began in 2003 to the present day, as well as making regular appearances on BBC Breakfast, BBC News 24 and The One Show

Roberts has also made appearances on Ready Steady Cook with Homes Under the Hammer co-presenter, Lucy Alexander. He has been a celebrity contestant on BBC gameshows Hole in the Wall and Pointless, raising money for charity. In July 2010 Roberts entered the BBC television programme Celebrity MasterChef, and was the first  eliminated.  In November 2016, Roberts was a contestant on I'm a Celebrity...Get Me Out of Here!. He was eliminated after spending 15 days in camp, coming in sixth place.

Roberts has presented radio throughout his career as the BBC's UK and Overseas Property expert contributing to many shows on BBC radios 2, 4 and 5 Live. He is a regular guest presenter on The Jeremy Vine Show which airs on BBC Radio 2 and Moneybox which airs on BBC Radio 4. In March 2016, Roberts began hosting a weekly property radio show for Talk Radio named “Gazumped” (Saturday 11am1pm and Sunday 57pm). The show was later renamed “Home Rule” and Sunday editions are no longer live, but recorded, broadcast from 6am to 8am.

In September 2012, Roberts publicly criticised proposed government changes to the planning laws of England that would double the size of extensions that do not need approval.

As well as presenting on both radio and television Roberts has written many books such as Teach Yourself Making Money from Property, and The Property Auction Guide

Roberts has also contributed to travelling books including Great Festivals of the World, The Travellers' Handbook and Intrepid Africa. Roberts is the author of The Villes Children's Books series. One of the books in the series, Sadsville, was written in partnership with the NSPCC to encourage children to contact ChildLine if they need someone to talk to about any problems, although it is unrelated to the subject of mental health. To promote this book, Martin Roberts went to his local primary school, at which his children attended. He performed a reading of the book and brought in a red bus for the children to go on. 

Roberts currently presents a radio show in which he investigates the living arrangements of famous footballers.

Personal life
For many years, Roberts has lived in Paulton near Bath, Somerset, and is married with two children. In 2017, he opened his village's annual "Party in the Park".

On 9 March 2023, Roberts announced that his father, Norman, had died aged 90.

Credits 
Television
 Put Your Money Where Your Mouth Is
 How to Survive the Property Crisis
 Wish You Were Here.
 Homes Under the Hammer
 BBC Breakfast
 BBC News 24
 The One Show
 Ready Steady Cook
 Hole in the Wall
 Celebrity MasterChef
 Pointless
 Dave Gorman: Modern Life is Goodish
 I'm a Celebrity...Get Me Out of Here!
 The Real Full Monty
Radio
 BBC Radio 
 The Jeremy Vine Show 
 Moneybox
 Gazumped
Books
 Great Festivals of the World
 The Travellers Handbook
 Intrepid Africa
 The Villes
 Teach Yourself Making Money from Property
 The Property Auction Guide

References

External links 
 
 personal website

1963 births
Living people
Alumni of the University of Bradford
English television presenters
I'm a Celebrity...Get Me Out of Here! (British TV series) participants
People from Bath, Somerset
People from Stockton Heath
People from Warrington
Real estate and property developers
Television personalities from Somerset